King of the Travellers is a 2012 Irish revenge drama written and directed by Mark O'Connor.

Plot 

The story follows John Paul Moorehouse on his destructive quest to uncover the truth about the killer of his father twelve years ago. John Paul's desire for revenge is swayed as he falls for Winnie Power, the daughter of the man he suspects killed his father. John Paul must now battle between his consuming passion for justice and his desire to be with the woman he now loves.

Cast 

 John Connors as John Paul Moorehouse
 Peter Coonan as Mickey Da Bags
 Michael Collins as Francis Moorhouse
 Carla McGlynn as Winnie Powers
 David Murray as Black Martin Moorehouse

Production 

In a bid for realism, diversity and authenticity, many non-actor Irish Travellers were cast in acting parts.

Release 

The film premiered at the Jameson Dublin International Film Festival on 14 July 2012 It was released in cinemas on 19 April 2013.

Reception 

The film has received generally negative reviews, and holds a 30% "Rotten" rating on aggregate review site Rotten Tomatoes, based on 10 reviews. Variety called the film a  "Gaelic Godfather" and praised "the genuinely engrossing action in the well-staged fight scenes." Total Film stated that "the story hits every expected beat and it’s enlivened with directorial bravura." The Independent criticized the film for being "less assured on the nuts and bolts of actual plotting" but praised Peter Coonan's acting performance as "an unregenerate yob who fires up the picture in the same way Robert De Niro's Johnny Boy did in Mean Streets 40 years ago."

References

External links 

 
 

2012 films
Irish crime films
2012 crime films
English-language Irish films
Works about Irish Travellers
Films about revenge
2010s English-language films